Pleasence is a surname. Notable people with the surname include:

 Angela Pleasence (born 1941), British actress
 Donald Pleasence (1919–1995), British actor
 Richard Pleasance, Australian rock musician and producer

See also
 Pleasance (disambiguation)